Richard Andrew "Butch" Johnson (born August 30, 1955 in Worcester, Massachusetts) is an archer from Woodstock, Connecticut in the United States. He has competed in the Summer Olympics five times, and was a part of the gold medal U.S. team at the 1996 Olympics and the bronze medal U.S. team in the 2000 Olympics.

2004 Summer Olympics
At the 2004 Olympics, he was surprisingly eliminated by Ron van der Hoff with 135-145 in the round of 64, placing 52nd overall in men's individual archery. He later placed 4th as a member of the United States team.

2008 Summer Olympics
At the 2008 Summer Olympics in Beijing Johnson finished his ranking round with a total of 653 points. This gave him the 40th seed for the final competition bracket in which he faced Andrey Abramov in the first round. Both scored 109 points in the regular match and they had to go to an extra round. In this extra round Abramov scored 25 points, while Johnson advanced to the second round with 26 points. There he faced eight seeded Im Dong-Hyun, who was too strong with 115-106.

Together with Brady Ellison and Vic Wunderle he also took part in the team event. With his 653 score from the ranking round combined with the 664 of Ellison and the 652 of Wunderle the Americans were in 10th position after the ranking round. In the first round they were not able to win against Chinese Taipei that won the confrontation by 222-218.

After the Olympics
Today, Butch Johnson has maintained himself as one of the best recurve shooters in the country, has ranked in the top five in the United States and placed sixth in the 2012 U.S. Olympic Team Trials. Amid speculation that he would retire following the Trials, Johnson came back to finish second in the 2012 National Target Championships and won a silver medal in the 2012 Hoyt World Open, second only to number one world ranked archer Brady Ellison.

References

1955 births
Living people
American male archers
Archers at the 1992 Summer Olympics
Archers at the 1996 Summer Olympics
Archers at the 2000 Summer Olympics
Archers at the 2004 Summer Olympics
Archers at the 2007 Pan American Games
Archers at the 2008 Summer Olympics
Olympic gold medalists for the United States in archery
Olympic bronze medalists for the United States in archery
Sportspeople from Worcester, Massachusetts
Medalists at the 2000 Summer Olympics
World Archery Championships medalists
Medalists at the 1996 Summer Olympics
Pan American Games gold medalists for the United States
Pan American Games silver medalists for the United States
Pan American Games medalists in archery
People from Woodstock, Connecticut
Archers at the 1999 Pan American Games
Medalists at the 1999 Pan American Games
Medalists at the 1995 Pan American Games
Archers at the 1995 Pan American Games
Medalists at the 2007 Pan American Games